George Melly (20 August 1830 – 27 February 1894) was an English merchant and shipowner and a Liberal politician who sat in the House of Commons from 1868 to 1875.

Life
Melly was the son of Andre Melly and his wife Ellen Greg, daughter of Samuel Greg of Manchester. He was educated at Rugby School and became a merchant and shipowner. He was a member of the Mersey Docks and Harbour Board, and a director of the Union Marine Insurance Co. He was a J.P. for Liverpool and was major of the 4th Lancashire Artillery Volunteers from 1859 to March 1866. He authored a number of books and pamphlets.
 
Melly stood unsuccessfully for Parliament at a by-election in April 1862 in Preston, and in Stoke-upon-Trent at the 1865 general election. Melly was elected as a Member of Parliament (MP) for Stoke-upon-Trent at a by-election in February 1868 following the resignation of the Conservative MP Alexander Beresford Hope. He was re-elected at the general election in November 1868, and in 1874, and held the seat until his resignation on 5 February 1875 by taking the Chiltern Hundreds.

Melly died at the age of 63.

Melly married Sarah Elizabeth Mesnard Bright, daughter of Samuel Bright, of Liverpool, in 1852. They had eight children of whom seven survived. Their children included the educationalist Florence Elizabeth Melly who was born in 1856.

He was the ancestor of George Melly, the jazz singer and writer, and Andrée Melly, the actress.

Publications
Khartoum and the Blue and White Niles
School Experiences of a Fag
Compulsory Education
Reformatory System
Italy
Future of the Working Classes

References

External links

1830 births
1894 deaths
Liberal Party (UK) MPs for English constituencies
UK MPs 1865–1868
UK MPs 1868–1874
UK MPs 1874–1880
People educated at Rugby School
British businesspeople in shipping
Volunteer Force officers
19th-century British businesspeople